Evan Ratliff (born c. 1975) is an American journalist and author. He is CEO and co-founder of Atavist, a media and software company. Ratliff is a contributor to Wired Magazine and The New Yorker. He has written one book and co-authored multiple others.

Career 
Ratliff is one of the co-authors of Safe: the Race to Protect Ourselves in a Newly Dangerous World. His article "The Zombie Hunters: On the Trail of Cyberextortionists", written for The New Yorker in 2005, was featured in The Best of Technology Writing 2006.

He is also the author of the book The Mastermind: Drugs. Empire. Murder. Betrayal., which profiles the criminal Paul Le Roux.

"Vanishing" experiment
In August 2009, Ratliff and Wired magazine conducted an experiment, wherein Ratliff "vanished" as far as knowledge of his whereabouts. Wired offered a $5,000 reward for anyone who could find him before a month had passed. During the experiment, Ratliff remained "on the grid", communicating with his followers on Twitter. The Google Wave development group proposed using the exercise as a test case for the new technology pushing the frontier of real-time web activity. NewsCloud set up its Facebook application community technology to report on the story and enhance community behind the #vanish hash tag. Ratliff used a specially created blog to taunt his "hunters" and Facebook groups emerged to team up and find him, while other groups formed to help him remain at large. He eventually was tracked and found on September 8, 2009, in New Orleans by @vanishteam, a group participating in the challenge to find him.

Ratliff left a coded message — FaLiLV/tRD:aN/HA:aSaTS; TW—tRS/tEKAA/tBotV; FSF—TItN/tGG/tCCoBB; JC—LJ/HoD/aOoP; JM—JGS/MWS/tBotH — which has been translated to be the authors and titles of a variety of books.

References

External links 

 Detailed account of "Vanishing" experiment
 "12 TO WATCH IN 2012: Evan Ratliff of The Atavist – Building Software to Tell Stories," The Observer (January 18, 2012)

American male journalists
Living people
1970s births
Wired (magazine) people